A bay window is a window space projecting outward from the main walls of a building and forming a bay in a room.

Types
Bay window is a generic term for all protruding window constructions, regardless of whether they are curved or angular, or run over one or multiple storeys.

In plan, the most frequently used shapes are isosceles trapezoid (which may be referred to as a canted bay window) and rectangle. 
But other polygonal shapes with more than two corners are also common as are curved shapes. If a bay window is curved it may alternatively be called bow window. Bay windows in a triangular shape with just one corner exist but are relatively rare.

A bay window supported by a corbel, bracket or similar is called an oriel window.

"Rawashin" is a traditional and distinctive style of corbelled bay window in Jeddah, Saudi Arabia (e.g., as on the frontage of Nasseef House).

Uses
Most medieval bay windows and up to the Baroque era are oriel windows. They frequently appear as a highly ornamented addition to the building rather than an organic part of it. Particularly during the Gothic period they often serve as small house chapels, with the oriel window containing an altar and resembling an apse of a church. Especially in Nuremberg these are even called , with the most famous example being the one from the parsonage of St. Sebaldus Church.

In Islamic architecture, oriel windows such as the Arabic mashrabiya are frequently made of wood and allow viewing out while restricting visibility from the outside. Especially in warmer climates, a bay window may be identical to a balcony, with a privacy shield or screen.

Bay windows can make a room appear larger, and provide views of the outside which would be unavailable with an ordinary flat window. They are found in terraced houses, semis and detached houses as well as in blocks of flats.

Based on British models, their use spread to other English-speaking countries like Ireland, the US, Canada and Australia. Following the pioneering model of pre-modern commercial architecture at the Oriel Chambers in Liverpool, they feature on early Chicago School skyscrapers, where they often run the whole height of the building's upper storeys. They also feature in bay-and-gable houses commonly found in older portions of Toronto. 

Bay windows were identified as a defining characteristic of San Francisco architecture in a 2012 study that had a machine learning algorithm examine a random sample of 25,000 photos of cities from Google Street View.

Gallery

See also
 Bay window caboose
 Bow window
 Bretèche
 Oriel window

References

External links

 

Architectural elements
Architecture in the San Francisco Bay Area
Windows